Smartie Mine (1999) is Iowa native singer/songwriter Dan Bern's follow-up to Fifty Eggs.

Track listing
Unless otherwise noted, all tracks by Dan Bern

"Smartie Mine" – 4:20
"One Thing Real" – 5:41
"Tiger Woods" – 3:07
"Chelsea Hotel" – 4:54
"City of Models" – 3:19
"Krautmeyer" – 3:55
"Crosses" – 5:18 
"Colors" – 3:25
"Airplane Blues" (Sleepy John Estes, Lightnin' Hopkins) – 8:39
"Freight Train Blues" (McDowell) – 4:52
"Talkin' Woody, Bob, Bruce & Dan Blues" – 5:09
"Ballerina" – 6:40
"Simple" – 8:52
"Beautiful Trees" – 2:41
"Joe Van Gogh" – 4:15
"Little Russian Girl" – 3:39
"Gamblin' With My Love" (Pete Rose) – 5:36
"Murderer" – 4:51 
"Alia" – 3:50
"Two-Month Affair" – 3:26
"Baby Love" (Wainwright) – 4:40
"Sculpter" – 4:56
"Dark Chocolate" – 3:42 
"Decadent Town" – 4:28
"Hooker" – 7:32
"Cocaine Blues/Blue Jay Way" (Davis, George Harrison) – 6:29
"True Revolutionaries" – 8:27

Personnel 

Dan Bern – Organ, Guitar, Harmonica, Cello, Vocals, Art Direction, Illustrations, Paintings
Martha Wainwright – vocals on "Baby Love"

References 

1999 albums
Dan Bern albums